Freylinia lanceolata is a South African shrub belonging to the family Scrophulariaceae.

This species prefers damp ground, riverbanks and marshy areas in the Western Cape, through to the Eastern Cape.

External links
Freylinia lanceolata

lanceolata
Shrubs